The Roman Catholic Archdiocese of Pointe-Noire is an archdiocese located in the city of Pointe-Noire in the Republic of the Congo.  This province has suffragan dioceses Dolisie and Nkayi.

History
 October 14, 1890: Established as Apostolic Vicariate of Lower French Congo from the Apostolic Vicariate of French Congo
 April 22, 1907: Renamed as Apostolic Vicariate of Loango
 January 20, 1949: Renamed as Apostolic Vicariate of Pointe-Noire
 September 14, 1955: Promoted as Diocese of Pointe-Noire
 May 30, 2020: Promoted as Archdiocese of Pointe-Noire

Leadership, in reverse chronological order
 Archbishops of Pointe-Noire (Roman rite), below
 Archbishop Miguel Angel Olaverri Arroniz, SDB (see below 2020.05.30 - present)
 Bishops of Pointe-Noire (Roman rite), below
 Bishop Miguel Angel Olaverri Arroniz, SDB (2013.02.22 - 2020.05.30 see above)
 Bishop Jean-Claude Makaya Loembe (1994.12.19 — 2011.03.31)
 Bishop Georges-Firmin Singha (1988.09.01 – 1993.08.18)
 Bishop Godefroy-Emile Mpwati (1975.06.05 – 1988.09.01)
 Bishop Jean-Baptiste Fauret, C.S.Sp. (1955.09.14 – 1975.06.05); see below
 Vicar Apostolic of Pointe-Noire (Roman rite), below
 Bishop Jean-Baptiste Fauret, C.S.Sp. (1947.02.13 – 1955.09.14); see above
 Vicars Apostolic of Loango (Roman rite), below
 Bishop Henri Friteau, C.S.Sp. (1922.03.22 – 1946.04.04)
 Bishop Léon-Charles-Joseph Girod, C.S.Sp. (1915.01.13 – 1919.12.13)
 Bishop Louis-Jean-Joseph Derouet, C.S.Sp. (1907.01.02 – 1914.03.04)
 Vicar Apostolic of Lower French Congo (Roman rite), below
 Bishop Antoine-Marie-Hippolyte Carrie, C.S.Sp. (1890.10.14 – 1903.11)

Suffragan Dioceses
Dolisie
Nkayi

See also
Roman Catholicism in the Republic of the Congo

Sources

 GCatholic.org
 Catholic Hierarchy

Pointe-Noire
Roman Catholic dioceses in the Republic of the Congo
Religious organizations established in 1890
Roman Catholic dioceses and prelatures established in the 19th century
A